The Soldier's Song is the debut novel from Alan Monaghan and the first in the Soldier's Song Trilogy.

Set during World War I, the novel follows the fortunes of Stephen Ryan, a gifted young maths scholar, as he enlists in the British army and leaves his native Ireland to fight in Europe.  He finds his loyalties tested, however, when he returns from the front in 1916 to find Ireland in the midst of an uprising. The harsh realities of war combined with the strain of having to reflect on his own identity and allegiances take their toll as Stephen is pushed ever closer to his breaking point.

Reception
The novel was positively received upon its release and gained, for its author, a nomination at the 2010 Irish Book Awards for best newcomer.  It has also been longlisted for the 2010/2011 Waverton Good Read Award.

References

External links
Pan Macmillan: The Soldier's Song
The Marsh Agency: The Soldier's Song
The View arts show reviews The Soldier's Song
Interview with author
Irish Times review
The Guardian review

2010 Irish novels
Novels set during World War I
Easter Rising
History of Ireland (1801–1923)
Novels set during the Irish War of Independence
2010 debut novels